South Carolina Highway 541 (SC 541) is a  state highway in the U.S. state of South Carolina. The highway connects Olanta with Coward.

Route description
SC 541 begins at an intersection with SC 341 (East Hampton Street/Olanta Highway) just east of Olanta, within Florence County. It travels to the east-northeast and crosses over Camp Branch before intersecting SC 403 (North Bethel Road). The highway curves to the east-southeast. When it enters Coward, it curves to the northeast and meets its eastern terminus, an intersection with U.S. Route 52 (US 52).

Major intersections

See also

References

External links

SC 541 at Virginia Highways' South Carolina Highways Annex

541
Transportation in Florence County, South Carolina